The Brazil–Uruguay football rivalry, also known as El Clásico del Río Negro, or Clássico do Rio Negro,  is a highly competitive sports rivalry between the Brazilian and Uruguayan national football teams, and their respective set of fans. Association football is the most popular sport in both countries and they have a combined 7 FIFA World Cups and 24 Copa Américas between them. Both countries also have a very close proximity and border each other, Uruguay only has a population of 3.5 million and has a size of 176,215 km2, while Brazil has a population of 210 million and a size of 8,515,767 km2, making it the 5th largest country in terms of both population and size.

Although not considered as big as Argentina's rivalries with Brazil or Uruguay, the games between them have a very tense atmosphere due to their infamous encounter in the de facto final of the 1950 FIFA World Cup where Uruguay completely shocked the Brazilian favorites 2–1 at the Maracanã Stadium in Brazil, allowing La Celeste to claim their 2nd World Cup title. The game nicknamed, the Maracanazo, is considered by many Brazilians (and the world media) as one of the nation's worst (and most embarrassing) ever defeats. A moment that was considered so traumatizing to Brazilian crowd watching, that many Brazilian newspapers didn't bother to report on the event, and some fans in the stands decided to commit suicide following the result, as the country expected to an easy victory.

Since then, Brazil have proved to be the more dominant team, both head-to-head with Uruguay and at international tournaments like the FIFA World Cup and Copa América. However, whenever they play against each other (especially at the Maracanã), there is a lot of fear in the Brazilian public that the "Phantom of '50" would resurface and they would lose again just like in 1950. Many Uruguayan fans love to remind their next-door neighbors of the "Phantom of '50", although many Brazilians say that the phantom is gone as Brazil have won 5 World Cups (the most of any nation), and Uruguay hasn't reached another final since. In any event, both teams had only one other encounter in the 1970 FIFA World Cup semifinals, which Brazil won 3-1. Brazil have also beaten Uruguay at the Maracanã multiple times since then. However, Brazil would suffer another embarrassing defeat at home soil: this time, against Germany, when they lost 7–1, at the Mineirão in the 2014 FIFA World Cup semi-finals.

Historical ties 

Uruguay has some historical ties to Brazil as the Thirty-Three Orientals successfully led a rebellion against the Empire of Brazil that eventually got them and the United Provinces of the Río de la Plata (now Argentina) to recognize Uruguay as an independent nation after signing they signed the Treaty of Montevideo in 1828.

Notable matches

First match 

Uruguay and Brazil played their first official match against each other in 1916 in the inaugural South American Championship, where Uruguay won 2–1 and won the tournament after a 0–0 draw with Argentina. Brazil on the other hand, finished in 3rd place.

1920 South American Championship 
At the 1920 South American Championship, A Seleção recorded their biggest ever defeat to any country, when they conceded 6 goals to La Celeste on 18 September 1920 at the Estadio Valparaíso Sporting Club in Viña del Mar, Chile. 64 years later, The game held the record for Brazil's worst ever defeat until the Mineiraço match in 2014, where Germany tied the record to 7–1.

Copa Río Branco 

From 1931 to 1976, Uruguay and Brazil irregularly met each other 10 times in the Copa Río Branco. The matches were used to decide which team was better at the time, similar to that of Roca Cup or Copa Lipton. Brazil won the first two editions in 1931 (in Rio de Janeiro) and 1932 (in Montevideo), both of them being one-off games. After that, every single edition until the final in 1976 would be a two-legged tie, with a win counting as 3 points and a draw counting as 1 point for each team. Goal difference wasn't taken into consideration. This would lead them to sharing the trophy in 1967 after they tied the first two matches and the replay.

1950 FIFA World Cup 

The 1950 FIFA World Cup final between them is perhaps the most famous match between Brazil and Uruguay as the match has been seen as the biggest in their rivalry. Brazil had cruised to victory in their first group stage, Group 1, as they beat every single team except Switzerland, who they only got to a 2–2 draw. Uruguay on the other hand, had only played one game in the entire tournament against Bolivia as France withdrew from the tournament and leaving the group with only two teams. Uruguay demolished Bolivia 8–0 and automatically qualified to the final round. Before the final match, Brazil had beaten Sweden 7–1 and Spain 6–1, while Uruguay barely scraped a 2–2 draw with Spain and a 3–2 win over Sweden. Brazil had also won the 1949 South American Championship, just a year before (also in Brazil), and many Brazilians expected a repeat of their 5–1 win over them during the tournament. Much of Brazil was already celebrating their victory before the match began. Multiple Brazilian news publications had already reported a Brazilian victory, while many civilians were busy in the streets, anticipating what-would-have-been-then, Brazil's first World Cup triumph. On the contrary, Uruguay were preparing for an upset and captain, Obdulio Varela, told his teammates, while they were in his bathroom to urinate on a bunch of Brazilian newspapers that had already declared Brazil, winners of the tournament. Brazil only needed at least a draw with Uruguay to win the competition, however, in the 79th minute of the match, Alcides Ghiggia, scored an unexpected winner under Brazilian goalkeeper, Barbosa, to bring the score 2–1 in Uruguay's favor. The entire stadium (minus the Uruguayans), was eerily quiet for the rest of the game. Many Brazilians were heartbroken after the match and there was no celebration in the streets. Much of the blame of the loss was directed towards Barbosa, for not saving the crucial shot, and he wasn't allowed to come to commentate a match or come to a training session for fear that we would jinx the team. However, he said in an interview before his death in 2000 that, "The maximum punishment in Brazil is 30 years imprisonment, but I have been paying, for something I am not even responsible for, by now, for 50 years." Ghiggia, on the other hand would say that only 3 people have ever silenced the Maracanã: Frank Sinatra, Pope John Paul II, and him.

1970 FIFA World Cup 

Uruguay and Brazil wouldn't meet each other at another FIFA World Cup until 1970 in the semifinals. The game has been described by some as one of the more memorable matches between them as the game took place exactly 20 years and 1 day after the infamous Maracanaço. Brazil were looking to exact revenge for their loss in 1950, however Uruguayan winger, Luis Cubilla opened the score in the 19th minute, in what looked to be a repeat of the Brazilians' 1950 loss. However, Clodoaldo, would bring the score 1–1 before the 1st half ended, and Brazil's samba-style football would take over in the second half as Jairzinho and Rivellino would each score two goals to win the game 3–1. Pelé, also produced one of the most memorable plays in football history, when in the second half, he played a through pass from Tostão, and fooled Uruguay keeper, Ladislao Mazurkiewicz, by not touching the ball, causing the keeper to come out of his penalty area and allowing Pele to make a clear shot. However, in the end, he missed it and the ball went just wide of the far post.

Brazil would then go to the final, where they beat rivals, Italy, 4–1.

1976 Taça do Atlântico 

On 28 April 1976, Brazil and Uruguay played an infamous match during an exhibition tournament. The friendly game, however, was not friendly, as the competition got violent very early on. In the first half, Marco Antônio suffered a hard foul from Darío Pereyra and Hebert Revetria, which angered Rivellino, causing him to pull Pereyra's hair. Minutes later, Manuel Keosseián did a hard tackle on Rivellino, getting him sent off. Zico converted the penalty afterwards. Rivellion was still very bitter about the tackle, and chased after Keosseián, which caused him to elbow Attilio Ramirez. Rivellino and Ramirez would chase each other and argue about the entire thing for the rest of the match, and a full on brawl broke out between the Brazil players and Uruguay players. Brazil won the game 2–1 at the Maracanã, with Uruguay's only goal coming from Jorge Torres. The arguments went on into the locker, and the game is still remembered for being the most violent showdown they have ever had.

1983 Copa América Finals

1989 Copa América 

In 1989, Brazil and Uruguay met again in the decisive match of the final group stage of an international tournament held in Brazil, played at the Maracanã Stadium. Uruguay were looking for their 3rd consecutive Copa América trophy, while Brazil were looking for their first Copa América title in 40 years, and a chance to end the misery they put on themselves back in 1950. In the 49th minute, Romário scored the only goal of the game, to ensure Brazil's victory and avenge the team that lost at the same stadium back in 1950.

1994 FIFA World Cup qualifier

1995 Copa América Final 

In 1995, Brazil and Uruguay met in the final match of the 1995 Copa América. At the time, Brazil had just won the 1994 FIFA World Cup Final against Italy, and were looking to end Uruguay's streak on winning every international tournament hosted by Uruguay. The game ended 1–1 after 90 minutes, thanks to goals from Uruguay's Pablo Bengoechea and Brazil's Túlio. However, Túlio wouldn't score a goal in the penalty shootout, as his shot was saved by Uruguayan goalie, Fernando Álvez, allowing Uruguay to win the match 5–3 on penalties.

1999 Copa América Final

2002 FIFA World Cup qualifier 

On 1 July 2001, Brazil played against Uruguay in a notable FIFA World Cup qualifier at the Estadio Centenario in Montevideo. The only goal of the game came from Federico Magallanes who converted a penalty in the 33rd minute. Brazil had many chances to score, however, they failed to make any chances. This was also Luiz Felipe Scolari's first game in charge of the national team, and he said that Rivaldo should have scored in the 85th minute. However, Uruguayan goalkeeper, Fabián Carini, appeared to be holding the ball in his own net, but referee Hugh Dallas did not think it was an equalizer. The game put a dent in Brazil's chances of qualifying, however they finished 3rd in the qualifying table, and Uruguay finished 5th, meaning that La Celeste would have to play in a Two-legged play-off against Australia, which they won 3–1 on aggregate. That game is also the last time that Uruguay has ever beat Brazil in any competition. Uruguay would go on to be knocked out in the group stage, while Brazil would win the entire competition, when Ronaldo scored 2 goals in the final against Germany.

2004 Copa América

2006 FIFA World Cup qualifier

2013 FIFA Confederations Cup

Matches overview

Eliminations 

 1919 Copa América Final: Brazil 1 x 0 Uruguay - Brazil Champion
 1970 World Cup Semifinal: Brazil 3 x 1 Uruguay - Brazil Classified
 1981 Mundialito   Final: Uruguay 2 x 1 Brazil - Uruguay Champion
 1983 Copa América Final: Uruguay 2 x 0 Brazil / Brazil 1 x 1 Uruguay (Aggregate: Uruguay 3 x 1 Brazil) - Uruguay Champion
 1995 Copa América Final: Uruguay 1 (5) x (3) 1 Brazil - Uruguay Champion
 1999 Copa América Final: Uruguay 0 x 3 Brazil - Brazil Champion
 2004 Copa América Semifinal: Brazil 1 (5) x (3) 1 Uruguay - Brazil Classified
 2007 Copa América Semifinal: Uruguay 2 (4) x (5) 2 Brazil - Brazil Classified
 2013 Confederations Cup Semifinal: Brazil 2 x 1 Uruguay - Brazil Classified

Titles overview

Senior/Official 

Note: Only the Olympic from 1908 to 1956 are considered official: .

Friendly

Youth

Women

Club

Club titles

Finals between clubs

See also 

 History of the Brazil national football team
 Mongrel complex
 Argentina–Brazil football rivalry
 Argentina–Uruguay football rivalry

References 

 
Brazil–Uruguay relations
Brazil national football team rivalries
Uruguay national football team rivalries
International association football rivalries